Shades of Darkness is a novel by Richard Cowper published in 1986.

Plot summary
Shades of Darkness is a novel in which a ghost story is the theme.

Reception
Dave Langford reviewed Shades of Darkness for White Dwarf #85, and stated that "The essence of horror is the turning of the screw. Cowper turns it with discreet style and wit, but never quite far enough."

Reviews
Review by Dan Chow (1987) in Locus, #313 February 1987
Review by Charles de Lint (1987) in Fantasy Review, April 1987
Review by Helen McNabb (1987) in Vector 137
Review by John Clute (1987) in Interzone, #20 Summer 1987
Review by Mike Christie (1987) in Foundation, #38 Winter 1986/87
Review by Don D'Ammassa (1988) in Science Fiction Chronicle, #100 January 1988

References

1986 novels